Terri Zemaitis-Boumans (born April 28, 1976) is a retired American female volleyball player. She was part of the United States women's national volleyball team at the 1998 FIVB Volleyball Women's World Championship in Japan.

References

External links
http://www.flovolleyball.tv/article/49615-the-greatest-players-in-penn-state-women-s-volleyball-history#.WOJyQFXyvIU
http://articles.chicagotribune.com/1998-09-11/sports/9809110107_1_russ-rose-nittany-lions-penn-state
http://chippewa.com/family-god-provide-zemaitis-support-to-handle-stresses-of-life/article_80998fe6-b9c0-55d3-97c5-91637e41454b.html
http://www.collegian.psu.edu/archives/article_5d795a17-ab86-546d-b048-1e53ccae2b6f.html

1976 births
Living people
American women's volleyball players
Place of birth missing (living people)
Penn State Nittany Lions women's volleyball players